Pavlo Hai-Nyzhnyk was born on May 28, 1971, in Dunaivtsi of Western Podillya (Khmelnytskyi Oblast), Soviet Union and is a Ukrainian historian, Doctor of Historical Sciences, Academician of the Ukrainian Academy of Sciences (Kyiv), Academician of the Academy of Political Sciences (Kyiv) and Ukrainian poet (Laureate International Literature Prize I.Koshelivets by 2013). Deputy Director, Scientific Research Institute of Ukrainian Studies, Ministry of Education and Science of Ukraine (Kyiv, Ukraine)

Early life and education
Hai-Nyzhnyk was born in a small city of Dunayivtsi in Podilia in 1971. He was an active participant of the independence movement in the times of perestroika in the Soviet Union and the founder and leader of the nationalistic youth organization "Union of Ukrainian Nation" (1986-1989 in Dunayivtsi). In 1988, for the first time in the history of the Soviet Podilia, he hoisted the national flag of Ukraine on the pipe of the Dunayivtsi dress factory of V.I.Lenin. He studied in Donetsk higher military-political school of engineering troops and troops of connection (1989–1991), graduated from the historical faculty of Kam’yanets'-Podil'skuy Teacher Training University named by V.P.Zatonsky (1995), post-graduated from the M.S.Hrushevsky Institute of Ukrainian archaeography and fontology of National Academy of Sciences of Ukraine (1998), and studied for the degree of doctor at National Taras Shevchenko University of Kyiv (2008).

A circle of his scientific interests is the history of Ukraine of the first half of the 20th century, human history and Ukrainian political history, history of national liberation competitions 1917–1921, history of domestic socio-economic and financial policy, biographical science.

Career
Candidate of historical sciences. The thesis submitted for a Candidate of History Degree in speciality 07.00.01. – History of Ukraine (National Taras Shevchenko University of Kyiv, 2000): Financial police of Government Ukrainian State headed by Hetman P.Skoropads’ky (29 April – 14 December 1918) .

Doctor of historical sciences. Dissertation for a doctoral degree in speciality 07.00.01 – History of Ukraine (National Taras Shevchenko University of Kyiv, 2008): Financial police headed by Central Rade and Governments of Ukrainian People's Republic (March 1917 – April 1918) .

Hai-Nyzhnyk worked at M.S.Hrushevsky Institute of Ukrainian archaeography and fontology of National Academy of Sciences of Ukraine (Kyiv), Research Financial Institute at Ministry of Finance of Ukraine (Kyiv), Ukrainian Research Institute of the archives and documents sources (Kyiv), Institute of society transformation (Kyiv), Krivuy Rig  State Pedagogical University (Kryvuy Rig), National Academy of Government Tax Service of Ukraine (Kyiv), I.F.Kuras Institute of Political and Ethnic Studies fontology of National Academy of Sciences of Ukraine (Kyiv).

Senior Research Scientist at I.F.Kuras Institute of Political and Ethnic Studies of National Academy of Sciences of Ukraine (Kyiv)

Head of Department of Historical Studies at the Scientific Research Institute of Ukrainian Studies (Kyiv)

Academician of the Ukrainian Academy of Sciences (Kyiv).

Academician of the Academy of Political Sciences (Kyiv)

Hai-Nyzhnyk has an award Order of the Sainted Prince Vladimir the Large the ІІІ degree (2006) and by the diploma of Ministry of Education and Science of Ukraine (2007). Laureate International Literature Prize I.Koshelivets by 2013.

Deputy Director, Scientific Research Institute of Ukrainian Studies, Ministry of Education and Science of Ukraine (Kyiv, Ukraine)

Works

Hai-Nyzhnyk has more than 1000 scientific publications, and also monographs:25

Personal monographs:

1. Pavlo Hai-Nyzhnyk. Documentary sources and materials to the history of financial policy of the Ukrainian State government (on April, 29 – on December, 14 in 1918). Reference book. - Kyiv, 2004. - 47 p. 

/ukr.: Гай-Нижник П. Документальні джерела і матеріали до історії фінансової політики уряду Української Держави (29 квітня - 14 грудня 1918 р.). Довідник. - К., 2004. - 47 с./

A new monography of Pavlo Hai-Nyzhnyk "Documentary sources and materials to the history of a financial policy of the Ukrainian State government (April, 29th - December, 14th, 1918)" was published.

2. Pavlo Hai-Nyzhnyk. Financial policy of Government Ukrainian State headed by Hetman Pavlo Skoropads'ky (on April, 29 – on December, 14 in 1918). - Kyiv, 2004. - 430 p. 

/ukr.: Гай-Нижник П. Фінансова політика уряду Української Держави Гетьмана Павла Скоропадського (29 квітня - 14 грудня 1918 р.). - Київ, 2004. - 430 с./

A new monography of Pavlo Hai-Nyzhnyk "Financial police of Government Ukrainian State headed by Hetman Pavlo Skoropads'ky (29 April - 14 December of 1918) was published.

3. Pavlo Hai-Nyzhnyk. The Fiscal Policy headed by Central Rade, governments UNR, Ukrainian State, Ukrainian Socialist Soviet Republic (1917–1930). - Kyiv, 2006. - 303 p. 

/ukr.: Гай-Нижник П. Податкова політика Центральної Ради, урядів УНР, Української Держави, УСРР (1917-1930 рр.). - К.: Цифра-друк, 2006. - 303 с./

A new monography of Pavlo Hai-Nyzhnyk "The fiscal police headed by Central Rade, governments UNR, Ukrainian State, USRR (1917–1930)" was published.

4. Pavlo Hai-Nyzhnyk. Ukrainian State bank: formation history. Documents and materials (1917–1918). - Kyiv, 2007. - 340 p. 

/ukr.: Гай-Нижник П. Український Державний банк: історія становлення. Документи і матеріали (1917-1918 рр.). - Київ: Цифра-друк, 2007. - 340 с./

A new monography of Hai-Nyzhnyk P. "The Ukrainian National bank: formation history. Documents and materials (1917-1918)"  was published.

5. Pavlo Hai-Nyzhnyk. UPR and WUPR: formation of the organs of power and the national state (1917-1920). - Kyiv: "SCHek", 2010. - 304 p. 

/ukr.: Гай-Нижник П. УНР та ЗУНР: становлення органів влади і національне державотворення (1917-1920 рр.). - К.: "ЩеK", 2010. - 304 с./

In the new book the author clarifies the process of the higher and local state authorities formation in Ukraine in the days of the Ukrainian National Republic (in the times of the Central Rada and Directory) and the West Ukrainian People's Republic (WUPR) in the context of complex process of national state formation in the turbulent 1917 – 1920 years. Achievements and failures of the state formation are analyzed, in particular, the legislative base, principles of formation and activity of the higher legislative and executive powers of the first and the second UPR and WUPR, the central and local state bodies, forms and a system of the Ukrainian state formations, the causes of the Central Rada downfall and also the success of Hetman P.Skoropadskyi’s coup d'état, preparation and an essence of the Directory uprising, unified and state strive of the Trans-Carpathian Ukrainians and the preconditions and consequences of the Reunited Act of UPR and WUPR. The monograph is intended for historians, men of law, government employees, political scientists and anybody who is interested in the Ukrainian past at the beginning of the 20th century.

6. Pavlo Hai-Nyzhnyk. Time for change (political essays and interviews for 2010–2013). - Kyiv, 2013. - 258 p. 

/ukr.: Гай-Нижник П. Час на зміни (політична публіцистика та інтерв’ю за 2010–2013 рр.). – К., 2013. – 258 с./

7. Pavlo Hai-Nyzhnyk. Ukrainian diplomacy and international financial policy of the governments of the Central Rada, Ukrainian State (Hetman) and UNR Directory (1917-1922). - Kyiv: Duliby, 2016. - 532 p. 

/ukr.: Гай-Нижник П. Українська дипломатія й міжнародна фінансова політика урядів Центральної Ради, Української Держави (Гетьманату) та Директорії УНР (1917–1922 рр.). – К.: Дуліби, 2016. – 532 с./

The new monograph doctor of historical sciences P.P.Hai-Nyzhnyk highlights the activities of Ukrainian diplomats and government officials in the context of maintaining international financial policy of the government of the Central Rada, Hetman and Directory for 1917–1922 years. The author analyzes the multifaceted aspects of international financial policy of the Ukrainian state and the Ukrainian People's Republic in comparison with the internal and foreign policy, and given the general financial and economic and public policies of national and state revival of Ukraine.
To put scientific use new, previously unknown, archival documents. The book is intended not only for researchers, diplomats, economists, students, but also a wide range of readers and anyone interested in Ukraine's modern history, the history of financial policy, diplomacy and international relations and so on.

8. Pavlo Hai-Nyzhnyk. Russia against Ukraine (1990-2016): from the policy of blackmail and coercion to war on takeover attempts and destruction. - Kyiv: MP "Lesya", 2017. - 332 p. 

/ukr.: Гай-Нижник П. Росія проти України (1990–2016 рр.): від політики шантажу і примусу до війни на поглинання та спроби знищення. – К.: «МП Леся», 2017. – 332 с./

The new monograph doctor of historical sciences P.P.Hai-Nyzhnyk "Russia against Ukraine (1990-2016): from the policy of blackmail and coercion to war on takeover attempts and destruction" highlights the complex diplomatic and military politychnyhvzayemyn between Russia and Ukraine in the context of interesiv Moskvy geopolitical and foreign policy of Kyiv, internal political and socio-economic situation in Ukraine during 1990-2016 years. The book analizuyutsyamizhnarodna Ukraine government policies in the context of national security, istorychnip eredumovy and geopolitical causes of aggression against the Russian Federation, the Ukraine u2014., and the military-political and financial-economic aspects of the Russian-Ukrainian war through the prism of global processes and global change.
Considered theoretical political, geopolitical, cultural, historical and foreign policy aspects of the annexation of the Crimea and armed conflict in the Donbass. With realism and withpositions interpreted specifics of international relations in the post-imperial (post) political space, including the place and role of Ukraine utsyvilizatsiynomu opposition Moskovian European West and East. The author presents his own assessment of the Russian Federation as a state-aggressor and sponsor of international terrorism, analyzes the current challenges and solutions to strengthen the Ukrainian national identity, strategy reintegration and de-occupation of the Crimea, strengthening of national security and defense of Ukraine.
Proposed means of public authorities, historians, political scientists, university professors, students and all those interested in the modern history of Ukraine and is indifferent to the fate of united and independent state of Ukraine.

Coauthor of:

1. Scientific documentary collection to a 90-anniversary  of introduction of government service in Ukraine. - Kyiv, 2008. - 124 p. 

/ukr.: Науково-документальна збірка до 90-річчя запровадження державної служби в Україні / Верстюк В., Гай-Нижник П., Коник С. та ін. – К.: Центр сприяння інституційному розвитку державної служби, 2008. – 124 с./

A new collective monography of Verstyuk V., Hai-Nyzhnyk P, Konyk S., "Scientific - documentary collected articles dedicated to 90-th anniversary of government service implementation in Ukraine." was published.

2. Essays of history of government service of Ukraine. - Kyiv, 2008. - 536 p. 

/ukr.: Нариси історії державної служби в Україні / Авт. колектив: Аркуша О.Г., Бородін Є.І., Віднянський С.В., Гай-Нижник П.П. та інш. - К.: Ніка-Центр, 2008. - 536 с./

"Essays on the history of government service in Ukraine" is the first in the Ukrainian historiography attempt to summarize in holistic research the numerous works devoted to the process of state formation, political and administrative system, government service formation and the activities of public servants. The authors begin their study with the analysis of the ancient society state organization and complete with the characteristic of construction and development of government service in the independent Ukraine. The book contains forms and types of (national, imperial, occupation) management activities on the Ukrainian lands. The text of "Essays" is prepared as part of a research project, which is carried out to-order the Centre for adaption the government service to the standards of the European Union, by means the State Budget of Ukraine. Ultimate purpose of research is a monograph and a collection of documents under the common title "The History of Government Service in Ukraine".

3. Banking system of Ukraine: measurings of global financial crisis. Expertly analytical lecture. - Kyiv: Dorado-druk, 2009. - 64 p. 

/ukr.: Банківська система України: виміри глобальної фінансової кризи. Експертно-аналітична доповідь / Авт. колектив: І.А.Белоусова, К.Г.Ваганов, С.В.Вовчок, П.П.Гай-Нижник та інш. - К.: Дорадо-друк, 2009. - 64 с./

The expert analytical report is done in conformity with the Governmental plan of actions over financial crisis in Ukraine and devoted to the system analysis of the banking system situation of Ukraine, the development directions of its reforming. The authors of the report are well - known scientists and experts in the field of banks and the finance, jurisprudence, history, sociology, economic security and the government administration.

4-5. The history of the Government Service in Ukraine. - Kyiv: Nika-Tsentr, 2009. - Vol.1. - 544 p. ; - Vol.2. - 512 p. 

/ukr.: Історія державної служби в Україні / Авт. колектив: О.Г.Аркуша, О.В.Бойко, Є.І.Бородін, С.В.Віднянський, П.П.Гай-Нижник та інш. У 5 т. - К.: "Ніка-Центр", 2009. - Т.1. - 544 с.; - Т.2. - 512 с./

The first volume of "The history of the Government Service in Ukraine" analyses a wide range of problems related to the state formation, political and administrative system, organizing state administration and government service and to the government employees’ activities. Authors begin their study with the analysis of relations between ancient states and societies in Ukraine and complete it with the characteristic of state formation process in the West Ukrainian National Republic. All forms and types (national, imperial, occupation) administrative activity on Ukrainian lands are analyzed. The fundamental research of the government service history in Ukraine is prepared as a part of the scientific project, which is carried out to-order the Centre for adaption the government service to the standards of the European Union, by means the State Budget of Ukraine and led by the Department of Government Service in Ukraine. The project is dedicated to the 90th  anniversary of the establishment government service in Ukraine and is being carried out pursuant to the instruction of the Cabinet of Ministers of Ukraine" In commemoration of  the 90th  establishment anniversary of the Government  Service" dated June 11, 2008 №817.

6. Economic security of the banking system in the context of new course of reforms in Ukraine 2010–2015 years. Expertly analytical lecture. - Kyiv: Dorado-druk, 2010. - 64 p. 

/ukr.: Економічна безпека банківської системи в контексті нового курсу реформ в Україні в 2010-2015 років. Експертно-аналітична доповідь / Авт. колектив: В.Г.Алькема, І.А.Белоусова, К.В.Ваганов, П.П.Гай-Нижник та інш. - К.: Дорадо-друк, 2010. - 64 c./

The expert analytical report is done in conformity with the Governmental plan of actions over financial crisis in Ukraine and devoted to the system analysis of the banking system situation of Ukraine, the development directions of its reforming. The authors of the report are well - known scientists and experts in the field of banks and the finance, jurisprudence, history, sociology, economic security and the government administration.

7. The state, authorities and civil society in the documents of political parties in Ukraine (end of 1980s - first half of 2011). - Kyiv: IPiEND, 2011. - 808 p. 

/ukr.: Держава, влада та громадянське суспільство у документах політичних партій України (кінець 1980-х - перша половина 2011 рр.) / М.С.Кармазіна, Т.А.Бевз, Д.В.Вєдєнєєв, П.П.Гай-Нижник, О.М.Любовець, С.В.Полтавець, О.М.Собачко, В.Д.Яремчук. - К.: ІПіЕНД ім. І. Ф. Кураса НАН України, 2011. - 808 с./

The collection presents extracts from the documents of modern Ukrainian political parties, in which their view for functioning of government, state institutions and civil society in Ukraine are displayed. The collection is intended for researchers, analysts, experts, leaders and members of political parties, public figures, anyone who is interested in questions of party development in Ukraine.

8. Ukrainian multi-party system: political parties, electoral blocs, leaders (the end of 1980 –s – early 2012). - Kyiv, 2012. - 588 p. 

/ukr.: Українська багатопартійність: політичні партії, виборчі блоки, лідери (кінець 1980 – х – початок 2012 рр.). Енциклопедичний довідник. – К.: ІПіЕНД ім. І.Ф. Кураса НАН України, 2012. – 588 с./

The reference book includes information materials about modern Ukrainian political parties (both active and those that ceased their existence) and their first leaders (founders), electoral coalitions, created on the eve of elections to the Verkhovna Rada of Ukraine III-VI convocations. The reference books is intended for researchers, analysts, experts, leaders and members of political parties, public figures, all who are interested in party building in Ukraine.

9. Ukraine for twenty years: materials of international veb-conference on Augusts, 22 in 2011. - Chernihiv, 2013. - 48 p. 

/ukr.: Україна за двадцять років: матеріали міжнародної веб-конференції 22 серпня 2011 р. / Черніг. центр перепідготовки та підвищення кваліфікації працівників органів держ. влади, органів місц. самоврядування, держ п-в, установ і організацій; Ред. кол.: В.М.Бойко (голова ред.) [та ін.]. – Чернігів: Сіверський центр післядипломної освіти, 2013. – 48 с./

«Ukraine for twenty years» is collection of materials of international veb-conference, which took place on Augusts, 22 in 2011 Its participants from Ukraine, Great Britain, Russia, Poland and USA, tried to give an answer for a question as in the world and independence of our state is perceived in Ukraine. Edition is intended for independent preparation of listeners within the framework of in-plant training, for all, who is interested in the problems of modern Ukraine.

10. Hai-Nyzhnyk Pavlo, Leiberov Oleksiy. UPR in a period Directory: search of model of the political system (end 1918 – 1919). - Nizhyn, 2013. – 214 p. 

/ukr.: Гай-Нижник П., Лейберов О. УНР у період Директорії: пошук моделі державного устрою (кінець 1918 – 1919 рр.). – Ніжин, 2013. – 212 с./

11. Political parties in Ukraine parliamentary election campaign 2012 / Collective monograph. - Kyiv: IPiEND them. IF Kuras National Academy of Sciences of Ukraine, 2013. - 400 p. 

/ukr.: Політичні партії України у парламентській виборчій кампанії 2012 року / Колективна монографія; М.Кармазіна, Т.Бевз, П.Гай-Нижник, А.Зуйковська, О.Рибій, В.Яремчук. – К.: ІПіЕНД ім. І.Ф. Кураса НАН України, 2013. – 400 с. /

12. Ukrainian studies: conceptual and theoretical-methodological foundations of development. - Kyiv., 2015. - 504 p. 

/ukr.: Українознавство: концептуальні та теоретико-методологічні основи розвитку / П.П.Гай-Нижник (керівник проекту), Т.А.Бевз, О.Є.Гомотюк, С.І.Губський, Я.С.Калакура, А.М.Киридон, І.Й.Краснодемська, В.Т.Лазарєва, А.Ю.Санченко, О.М.Склярова, Л.К.Токар, Д.В.Толочко, Л.В.Чупрій, О.Б.Ярошинський. – К., 2015. – 504 с./

In the collective labor sponsored summarizes the role, objectives, principles and achievements during the restoration of Ukrainian state independence Ukraine, analyzes the general trends and peculiarities of its development at the present historical stage, deepening the conceptual and theoretical-methodological basis, it appears the role of basic concepts and categories in Ukrainian development. The main focus is on learning experiences and lessons learned are already being self-creation and self Ukrainian people; understanding the phenomenon of the national idea as the inner essence factor expression of the nation; substantiation of new approaches to the use of general methodological principles of Ukrainian scientific studies and study their techniques and so on.

13. Pavlo Hai-Nyzhnyk, Oleh Batrak. Dogmatic faith in the catholic church and of Christianity in ancient (end of IX - the middle of XI.). Sketch of historical and hermeneutic interpretation. - Kyiv., 2015. - 278 p. 

/ukr.: Гай-Нижник П. П., Батрак О. П. Догматика віри в Кафолічній Церкві й запровадження християнства у Давній Русі (кінець ІХ – середина ХІ ст.). Нарис історико-герменевтичної інтерпретації. – К.: «МП Леся», 2015. – 278 с./

The book authors analyze complex and ambiguous process of Christianity in Rus end of IX - the middle of XI. In the context of contemporary European philosophy and Christianity highlights the theological commonality and differences are common at the time of the Christian Church, but which had already torn by political and ideological and dogmatic contradiction. It turns out the place, role and self-determination of in those processes.
Authors, given the historical-hermeneutic interpretation and Slavic Cyril and Methodius tradition (in comparison with Arian, Byzantine and Latin), the then untie knots theological ideas and dogmas, including such terms and concepts as the "Holy Trinity", "consubstantial "" podibnosuschnist "" Creed "and so on. Traced ideological and religious, political and ideological way of to the introduction of Christianity in the country Volodymyr the Great and his approval of Yaroslav the Wise.
The book also discusses prerequisites, reasons and circumstances of the adoption of Christianity by Grand Prince Vladimir of Kyiv Svyatoslavich its symbolic and spiritual content, analyzes the princely act in this area. Establish religious and political uzrinnya, tactics and strategy of consolidation of the Faith of Christ Grand Duke of Kyiv Yaroslav (the Wise) Vladimirovich, his vision of the Church in the Ruthenian state, society, in the Slavic world view, as well as among religious and spiritual centers of the state of contemporary Christian world.

14. Russian occupation and the de-occupation of Ukraine: history, current threats and challenges. - Kyiv, 2016. - 352 p. 

/ukr.: Російська окупація і деокупація України: історія, сучасні загрози та виклики сьогодення: Матеріали Всеукраїнської науково-практичної конференції (Київ, 2016 р.) / Упор. П. Гай-Нижник. – К.: «МП Леся», 2016. – 352 с. /

The proposed collection contains Ukrainian scientific-practical conference "The Russian occupation and the de-occupation of Ukraine: history, current threats and challenges", held in 2016 in Kyiv.
The authors of the papers presented its own view on the historical origins and parallel Russian aggression against Ukraine, gave a scientific assessment of the Russian Federation as a state-aggressor and sponsor of international terrorism, analyzed the Russian-Ukrainian war that began in 2014 as a result of the treacherous attack Russia and Challenges and how to strengthen the system of national security of Ukraine.
Proposed means of public authorities, historians, political scientists, university professors, students and all those interested in the modern history of Ukraine and is indifferent to the fate of united and independent Ukraine.

15. The aggression of Russia against Ukraine: historical background and current challenges. - Kyiv., 2016. - 586 p. 

/ukr.: Агресія Росії проти України: історичні передумови та сучасні виклики / П.П.Гай-Нижник (керівник проекту, упоряд. і наук. ред.); авт. кол.: П.П.Гай-Нижник, Л.Л.Залізняк, І.Й.Краснодемська, Ю.С.Фігурний, О.А.Чирков, Л.В.Чупрій. – К.: «МП Леся», 2016. – 586 с./

The authors of the collective monograph "Russian aggression against Ukraine, the historical background and current challenges" gave the reader his own perception of historical sources and parallels Russian aggression against Ukraine, made a scientific assessment of the Russian Federation as a state-aggressor and sponsor of international terrorism, analyzed the Russian-Ukrainian war which began in 2014 as a result of the treacherous attack, as well as the current challenges and how to strengthen the system of national security of Ukraine.
Proposed means of public authorities, historians, political scientists, university professors, students and all those interested in the modern history of Ukraine and is indifferent to the fate of united and independent Ukraine.

16. Russian aggression against Ukraine: Problems optimize public administration and national security system. Expert-analytical report. - Kyiv., 2016. - 28 p. 

/ukr.: Агресія Російської Федерації проти України: проблеми оптимізації державного управління та системи національної безпеки. Експертно-аналітична доповідь / П.П.Гай-Нижник (керівник проекту, упоряд., наук. ред.); авт. кол.: П.П.Гай-Нижник, Л.Л.Залізняк, І.Й.Краснодемська, Ю.С.Фігурний, О.А.Чирков, Л.В.Чупрій. – К.: «МП Леся», 2016. – 28 с./

The purpose of expert-analytical report is to analyze the characteristics of armed political conflict in eastern Ukraine and the development of possible scenarios to solve it and reintegration of the occupied territories of Donbass and Crimea Ukrainian constitutional and socio-cultural space. It is noted that stsenapiy vypishennya konfliktu nA shodi Ukpayiny shlyahom peintehpatsiyi tepytopiy vyhlyadaye nayskladnishym various staates but with tochky zopu natsionalnyh intepeciv Ukpayiny, zabezpechennya dovhoctpokovoyi pehionalnoyi ctabilnocti ta tsiley pozvytku depzhavy vyhlyadaye naybilsh acceptable.

Poetry (Collections of poetries) 

1. Remember me... Lyric poetry of love (Kyiv, 2006. - 114 p.) 

/ukr.: Згадуй мене... Лірика кохання/

2. Taste of freedom... Lyric poetry of life (Kyiv, 2009. - 95 p.) 

/ukr.: Смак свободи... Лірика життя/

3. Fluctuation. Poetry (Kyiv, 2015. - 97 p.) 

/ukr.: Плинність. Поезія/

* Vilaґ feelings. Collection of Ukrainian poetry (Uzhgorod, 2012. - P.408-412) 

/ukr.: Вілаґ почуттів. Збірник української поезії/

* Thee I waved at night. Poetry ("Sobornist" (Israel). - 2013. - No.1-2 (46-47). - Р.50-61) 

/ukr.: Тебе я колихав ночами. Поезії/

* Warriors of Light. Collection of Ukrainian poetry (Uzhgorod, 2015. - Vol.1. - Р.61-63; - Vol.2. - P.51-53) 

/ukr.: Воїнам світла. Збірник української поезії/

New Poetry  and Lyric Gallery

References
 web pages:
http://www.hai-nyzhnyk.in.ua
 I.F.Kuras Institute of Political and Ethnic Studies fontology of National Academy of Sciences of Ukraine
 Швидкий В., Шепель Л. Гай-Нижник Павло Павлович // Українські історики ХХ століття. Серія «Українські історики». — Вип.2, Ч.3. — К.: НАН України, 2006. — С.43-45 ;
 Library Stanford University (California, USA)
 Головко І. Науковий погляд на історію // Вісник податкової служби України. - 2007. - №41. - С.78-80;
 Noiret S. Publications on financial history 2004 // Financial History Review. – Volume 13. – Issue 02. – Cambridge: University Press, Oct 2006. – Р.235–307;
 Noiret S. Publications on financial history 2006 // Financial History Review. – Volume 15. – Issue 02. – Cambridge: University Press, Oct 2008. – Р.203–261.

21st-century Ukrainian historians
1971 births
Living people
21st-century Ukrainian poets
People from Dunaivtsi
Members of the National Academy of Sciences of Ukraine
Ukrainian male poets
21st-century male writers